A dead weight tester  apparatus uses unknown traceable weights to apply pressure to a fluid for checking the accuracy of readings from a pressure gauge.  A dead weight tester (DWT) is a calibration standard method that uses a piston cylinder on which a load is placed to make an equilibrium with an applied pressure underneath the piston. Deadweight testers are so called primary standards which means that the pressure measured by a deadweight tester is defined through other quantities: length, mass and time.
Typically deadweight testers are used in calibration laboratories to calibrate pressure transfer standards like electronic pressure measuring devices.

Formula

The formula on which the design of a DWT is based basically is expressed as follows :

where :

To be able to do accurate measurements, this formula has to be refined.

Absolute pressure with vacuum reference

Gauge pressure

Nomenclature

Piston cylinder design
In general there are three different kind of DWT's divided by the medium which is measured and the lubricant which is used for its measuring element :

 gas operated gas lubricated PCU's
 gas operated oil lubricated PCU's
 oil operated oil lubricated PCU's 

All three systems have their own specific operational demands. Some points of attention :

Gas-gas
Make sure that the PCU is clean. This is a very important issue as the PCU's  operation is sensitive to contamination. Also when connecting a DUT, make sure that the DUT does not introduce contamination in the measuring system.

Gas-oil
Lubricant of the PCU 'leaks' in the gas-circuit of the DWT. For this reason there is a small reservoir incorporated in the system. Before commencing a calibration it is a good practice to purge this reservoir. If the reservoir is full, oil will be introduced in critical tubing and will cause an uncontrollable oil-head.

Oil-oil
When connecting an oil filled DUT on an oil DWT make sure that the DUT oil will not contaminate the DWT oil. If in doubt. Incorporate a small volume between DUT and DWT and manipulate pressure in such a matter that the oil flow is directed to the DUT.
For high accuracy measurement, friction can be lowered by rotation of the piston.

See also

Blaise Pascal
Pascal (unit)
Calibration
Force gauge
Piezometer
Pressure measurement
Pressure sensor
Vacuum engineering

References

External links
http://www.euramet.org/index.php?id=calibration-guides

Measuring instruments